Worcester County Hospital was a hospital operated by Worcester County which was operational from 1931 until 1993 in Boylston, Massachusetts. Originally opened as a tuberculosis hospital, the hospital eventually became the county hospital for Worcester until its closure in 1993.

References

External links
Image of workers who just voted to join a union

Hospital buildings completed in 1931
Hospitals in Worcester County, Massachusetts
Defunct hospitals in Massachusetts